Marcus Popillius Laenas was a four-time consul of the Roman Republic. In the year (according to Varro) 359 BC, he defeated a Gallic army.

Near the end of his consulship with Gnaeus Manlius Capitolinus Imperiosus, the Tarquinians invaded the Roman territories on the Etruscan border, if this Gallic war took place 30 years after the occupation of Rome by the Gauls (in 386/5 BC). Dio Cassius apparently identifies this war with the one in Camillus's fifth dictatorship when the election of the consuls was resumed. Those events took place in 364 BC, about a decade earlier, according to Livy.

He is named by Cicero as flamen Carmentalis, the flamen of Carmenta, in 359 BC.

References

4th-century BC Roman consuls
Pontifices
Laenas, Marcus consul 395 AUC
Ancient Roman generals